Zaklopatica is a small village in southern Croatia. It is located on the Adriatic island of Lastovo in Dubrovnik-Neretva County.

References

Lastovo
Populated coastal places in Croatia
Populated places in Dubrovnik-Neretva County